The 2003 season was the 98th season of competitive football in Norway.

Men's football

League season

Tippeligaen

Play-offs 
November 10: Sandefjord – Vålerenga 0–0

November 22: Vålerenga – Sandefjord 5–3 (agg. 5–3)

Vålerenga stay up.

Top scorers 
17 goals: Harald Martin Brattbakk, Rosenborg

15 goals: Frode Johnsen, Rosenborg

13 goals: Håvard Flo, Sogndal

11 goals: Magne Hoseth, Molde
Erik Nevland, Viking

10 goals: Edwin van Ankeren, Odd Grenland
Thomas Finstad, Stabæk

1. divisjon

2. divisjon

3. divisjon

Norwegian Cup

Final

Women's football

League season

Toppserien

1. divisjon

Norwegian Women's Cup

Final
Medkila 2–1 Kolotn

Men's UEFA competitions

Norwegian representatives
Rosenborg (UEFA Champions League)
Vålerenga (UEFA Cup, cup winner)
Molde (UEFA Cup)
Lyn (UEFA Cup)

Champions League

Qualifying rounds

Second qualifying round

Third qualifying round

UEFA Cup

Qualifying round

First round

Second round

Third round

Intertoto Cup
No Norwegian representative this season.

UEFA Women's Cup

Norwegian representatives
Kolbotn

Second qualifying round

Group 6

Matches (in Kolbotn)

Quarter-finals

National teams

Norway men's national football team

Friendlies

UEFA Euro 2004 qualifying

Group 2

Matches

UEFA Euro 2004 qualifying play-offs

Norway women's national football team

January 23: Norway – United States 1–3, friendly

January 26: Norway – Germany 2–2, friendly

January 29: China – Norway 1–1, friendly

February 17: Norway – Denmark 3–3, friendly

February 20: Norway – Denmark 4–0, friendly

March 14: Sweden – Norway 1–1, friendly

March 16: Norway – United States 0–1, friendly

March 18: Norway – Canada 1–0, friendly

March 20: Norway – France 1–0, friendly

May 11: Norway – Belgium 6–0, European Championship qualifier

May 15: Norway – Netherlands 2–0, European Championship qualifier

August 2: Norway – Nigeria 3–2, friendly

September 11: Norway – Denmark 1–1, European Championship qualifier

September 20: Norway – France 2–0, World Cup 1st round

September 24: Norway – Brazil 1–4, World Cup 1st round

September 27: South Korea – Norway 1–7, World Cup 1st round

October 1: United States – Norway 1–0, World Cup quarterfinal

November 1: Spain – Norway 0–2, European Championship qualifier

References

 
Seasons in Norwegian football